Anthony Salveyn (aka Anthony Salvin) was a Master of University College, Oxford, England.

Anthony Salveyn was Master of Sherburn Hospital in County Durham and also held a stall as a canon at Durham Cathedral.
He was a Fellow of University College and elected Master of the College in 1557. He resigned from the post the following year in December 1558. The previous month, Queen Elizabeth I had succeeded her sister Queen Mary. He was not a supporter of the Reformation. In the following year, he lost his post at Sherburn and was confined to Kirby Moorside.

Anthony Salveyn was probably the brother of Richard Salveyn, who preceded George Ellison as Master of University College.

References 

Year of birth missing
Year of death missing
16th-century English educators
People from County Durham (district)
16th-century English Anglican priests
Fellows of University College, Oxford
Masters of University College, Oxford